Crenshaw House may refer to:

Crenshaw-Burleigh House, Dermott, Arkansas, listed on the National Register of Historic Places (NRHP) in Chicot County
Crenshaw House (Gallatin County, Illinois), also known as the Old Slave House, listed on the NRHP in Gallatin County
Crenshaw House (Crenshaw, Mississippi), listed on the NRHP in Panola County
Crenshaw House (Richmond, Virginia), listed on the NRHP in Richmond